George Valentine may refer to:

George Valentine (1852–1890), Scottish photographer.
George Valentine (footballer) (1899–1980), Australian rules footballer
George Valentine (poet) (1877–1946), Scottish sheriff and writer

See also
George Valentine Cox (1786–1875), English author